Martin Dale Chambers (born 4 September 1951 in Hereford) is an English musician, who is best known as a founding member and drummer of the rock band the Pretenders. In addition to playing the drums with the group, Chambers sings backing vocals (lead vocals on the song "Fast or Slow (The Law's the Law)", the B-side of the singles "2000 Miles" and "Show Me", which he also wrote) and plays percussion. He was part of the original band line-up which also included Chrissie Hynde (vocals/guitar), James Honeyman-Scott (guitar/vocals/keyboards) and Pete Farndon (bass guitar/vocals). Hynde and Chambers are the only two surviving original members, and he has served two separate tenures with the group.

Career
Prior to joining the as yet unnamed Pretenders, Chambers played with James Honeyman-Scott in Cheeks, a band led by former Mott the Hoople keyboardist Verden Allen. At the time Chambers joined the yet unnamed band in 1978, he was working as a driving instructor in Tufnell Park, London where he had got a job with the British School of Motoring "because it came with a car so I could get about" and because of that he found where Jim and Pete were living and then replaced Gerry Mcilduff on drums (Uncut, 1999). At Chambers's first rehearsal with the group, Hynde recalled: "We plugged in and started playing "Precious", and I remember clearly, I had to turn around and face the wall, I was laughing so hard, because as soon as Martin started playing with us, I knew this was it. We had the band." (Uncut, 1999). Martin also recalled the rehearsal "We knew it straight away. We just locked in." (Rhino Entertainment Company, 2006). In the Autumn of 1981, The Pretenders cancelled their US+Canada Tour as Chambers had cut his hand, and the injury was so bad that he couldn’t play for a number of weeks. The band decided to postpone the tour rather than replace Chambers. 

Chambers proved to be a versatile drummer within the group, with a hard-hitting style that is evident on songs such as "Middle of the Road". Guitarist Adam Seymour has acknowledged that "there's a definite thing going on in the rhythm between Chrissie's guitar and Martin's drums that you would need a scientific equation to explain. Martin kind of pulls back on the beat while Chrissie's pushing it forward." (Rhino Entertainment Company, 2006).

Chambers' first tenure with the group lasted from mid-1978 until the mid-1980s. Coping with the death of bandmates Honeyman-Scott and Farndon proved difficult, and his consequent lack of enthusiasm resulted in his departure from the group during the Get Close sessions. According to Hynde, "I felt his playing had deteriorated. I think he was still very traumatized by [the loss of] Pete and Jimmy." (Uncut, 1999) Martin concurred, admitting "I wasn't really into it to be honest."

Chambers rejoined the group in 1994 during the sessions for Last of the Independents, and has been with the group ever since (Uncut, 1999). When he rejoined, Seymour recalled "When Martin sat down, it began to feel like a real band." Martin summed up his reunion with the group, saying: "at the end of the day [Chrissie] asked me back because no one could make it work quite like we did." (Rhino Entertainment Company, 2006) Hynde concurred, saying: "I missed him terribly. ... Both he and I were floundering—and probably not playing well—and I needed someone to kick me in the ass and inspire me. We went through one song and it was the same buzz as when we first played together. No one has that swing and feel." (Hot Press, 1994).

In late 2008, The Pretenders released the album Break Up the Concrete with Chambers being replaced by Jim Keltner, although Chambers remained an official member and played with the band on live dates. In addition to playing with the Pretenders, Chambers also plays in the band Miss World fronted by songwriter Jonathan Perkins, who had worked with artists such as XTC and Original Mirrors.

In late September and early October 2009, Chambers sat in on drums for the seven Mott the Hoople reunion shows (2 in Monmouth and 5 at Hammersmith Odeon) alongside former Cheeks bandmate Verden Allen due to the illness of Dale Griffin who had loaned Chambers his kit for his first live show in 1967 at St. Mary's Church Hall, Ross on Wye, Herefordshire.

Discography
 1979 – Pretenders
 1981 – Extended Play
 1981 – Pretenders II
 1984 – Learning to Crawl
 1986 – Get Close (track 11)
 1994 – Last of the Independents (tracks 3, 4, 6 & 12)
 1999 – Viva el Amor
 2002 – Loose Screw
 2009 – Hammersmith Live with Mott the Hoople
 2014     DVD Mott the Hoople Live in Manchester November 2013
 2020 - Hate for Sale

Sources
 Hot Press, Hynde Sight, 4 May 1994.
 Ben Edmonds, Rhino Entertainment Company (2006), This Is Pirate Radio, Pirate Radio Box Set booklet.
 Allan Jones, Uncut, June 1999, Rock and Roll Heart (Pretenders Special), by Allan Jones, pp. 46–65.

References

External links
 Pretenders 977 Radio

1951 births
Living people
English rock drummers
People from Hereford
The Pretenders members
Dave Stewart and the Spiritual Cowboys members